The Hooper Island Light is a lighthouse in the Chesapeake Bay, west of Middle Hooper Island in Maryland.

History
The initial request of a light at this site was made in 1897, but construction was delayed until 1901 after the Variety Iron Works Company failed to deliver materials in time. Unlike earlier caisson lights in the bay, the foundation was placed using the pneumatic process, in which the caisson is kept under pressure to expel water, and the interior is excavated to bring the cylinder down to the desired depth.

The tower is taller than other Maryland sparkplug lights because of the provision for a watch room as well as a lantern atop the tower, the only example in the state. A fog bell was originally housed on the lower gallery but was later moved to the watch room level, a backup to the fog horn added in the 1930s. The characteristic was changed several times through the years, with different patterns of flashes and eclipses.

Along with many other Chesapeake Bay lights, automation came in the early 1960s. In 1976 the original fourth-order Fresnel lens was stolen, and it was replaced with a solar-power lamp.

The lighthouse was added to the National Register of Historic Places on December 2, 2002 as Hooper Island Light Station. The structure was officially turned over to the U.S. Lighthouse Society in June 2009, but the light remains active. 

Located in the northeast corner of a U.S. Navy "danger zone", overnight occupation of the lighthouse is prohibited, per agreement between the GSA and the U.S. Navy's Naval Air Systems Command.

Auction
In 2022, the General Services Administration announced that the lighthouse was put up for auction with a minimum bidding price of $15,000. Will Powell a GSA spokesman, explained the difficulties of auctioning off the property to include no docking facility for boats, as well as no water, sewage, electricity or gas. According to Powell, an additional challenge to a prospective bidder is the requirement to maintain the lighthouse in accordance with specific rules governing structures on the National Register of Historic Places. 

The lighthouse sold for $192,000 on September 22, 2022.

Notes

References
 Hooper Island Lighthouse, from the Chesapeake Chapter of the United States Lighthouse Society
 Hooper Island Lighthouse, from Lighthousefriends.com

External links
 Chesapeake Bay Lighthouse Project - Hooper Island Light
 , including photo from 1991, at Maryland Historical Trust

Hoopers Island
Lighthouses completed in 1902
Lighthouses on the National Register of Historic Places in Maryland
Transportation buildings and structures in Dorchester County, Maryland
National Register of Historic Places in Dorchester County, Maryland